Crescendo (Chinese: 起飞) is a Singaporean musical drama produced by production company Wawa Pictures and telecast on MediaCorp Channel 8. The drama began production in May 2015 and will make its debut on 23 October 2015. The show aired at 9 pm on weekdays and had a repeat telecast at 8 am the following day.  It stars Christopher Lee, Tay Ping Hui, Darren Lim, Jacelyn Tay, Cynthia Koh and Ann Kok in this series.

The series is set against the backdrop of the Xinyao Movement, synonymous with the pursuit of dreams of a young generation of Singaporeans in the local music industry, and a part of Singapore culture many still hold dear.

Plot
In the late 80s, three Xinyao fans from junior college, Yang Yiwei, Jiang Chufan and Luo Dawei came together to form a group named "Crescendo". They were later joined by Wang Yafang and Irene Lin Meiling. Jiang and Wang became a couple, not knowing that Yang also had a crush on Wang , and Lin's admiration of Jiang. Eventually, Yang and Wang got married; Jiang and Lin got married as well but divorced years later.

After they graduated from university, the three men pooled their savings to fund a record company labelled "Crescendo". Jiang is the creative director and Yang is the chief executive officer. Whenever the both of them argued over clashes in business perspectives, Luo have to step forward to mediate.

Yang encountered operational and financial difficulties due to market competitions and change of trends. Just when all hope seems lost, Luo found a venture-capital firm to invest in their record company. The trio met the managing director of the firm, and were surprised to see Chufan's ex-wife, Lin. Lin assured them that her decision to invest is purely based on the potential she saw in "Crescendo"; but to seal the deal, she wants 49% of the company's shares. Yang and Luo were sceptical of Irene's intention but she managed to convince them that she will not interfere in the company's operations. They eventually agreed to let Lin come on board.

With the newly injected fund, the trio decided to start a music school. Luo flew to Taiwan to invite Shirley Deng Xueli, an ex-xinyao singer whom he had a crush on for years, to join "Crescendo" as a singing teacher. Deng had joined a Taiwan production company after her graduation in the early days, and had moved on to develop her singing career in Hong Kong and Taiwan. She experienced several setbacks so when Luo finally found Deng, she was performing in a small café in Taiwan. Initially, she rejected Luo's offer but after much persuasion, she relented.

The appearance of Deng irked Lin as Deng was attracted to the talented Jiang. This caused friction between the three men, leaving "Crescendo" in havoc. Amidst the chaos, Lin took the opportunity to activate her revenge plan.

In the end, Lin sold "Crescendo" away and left for overseas. Whereas, Jiang continue his ambition by going to "Genesis".

Yang received Lin's call one day, leaving the show in a cliffhanger.

Cast

Main Cast

 Christopher Lee as Yang Yiwei 杨毅伟. One of the members of "Crescendo" in the late 80s who aspires to spread the xinyao movement. Brian Ng 黄超群 as Teenage Yang. 
 Tay Ping Hui as Jiang Chufan 江楚帆. One of the members of "Crescendo" in the late 80s. Xu Bin as Teenage Jiang. Singing voice provided by Elton Lee 李泓伸

Supporting Cast

Special Appearances

Original Sound Track (OST)

Soundtrack

A compilation album showcasing songs from Crescendo will be pre-released during the Crescendo Concert on 14 November 2015, and was subsequently released in CD-Rama stores on 16 November. It comprises 3 original songs, as well as 19 remakes of Xinyao songs.

Production 
Originally, the show title was going to be "Our Story" (我们的故事). The title was changed during pre-production, possibly to avoid confusion with the movie Long Long Time Ago, which has the same Chinese title.
Boon Hui Lu played Huiru, a singer with the same Chinese name pronunciation but in the musical, she played Irene, a totally different character.

Crescendo Concert
As part of a holistic viewing experience, Ocean Butterflies, Wawa Pictures and MediaCorp Channel 8 have come together to present a ticketed concert. This is the first such tripartite collaboration in history and is unique on its own with it being an extension from Crescendo.

The theme of the concert is LEGACY, showing the evolution of Singapore music from Xinyao to S-Pop. Besides those by local Xinyao pioneers, there will be performances by local rising stars such as Ling Kai and Bonnie Loo, as well as by cast members of Crescendo, including Christopher Lee, Ann Kok and Darren Lim. As part of a transmedia campaign to create a timely reel to real engaging experience, they will appear in characters at the concert. The concert will be filmed and snippets of it will be shown in the series finale of the show, which airs on 3 December 2015.

"Crescendo Concert" was held at The Max Pavilion – Singapore Expo on 14 November 2015, 8pm. This is after episode 16 of the drama so viewers would be familiarised with the leads.

Crescendo the Musical 
In 2016, it was announced that a musical based on the series, titled Crescendo the Musical, would be presented at Kallang Theatre.

Accolades

See also
List of Crescendo episodes
List of MediaCorp Channel 8 Chinese drama series (2010s)

References

Singapore Chinese dramas
Musical television series
2015 Singaporean television series debuts
2015 Singaporean television series endings
Channel 8 (Singapore) original programming